Larry Krutko (born June 27, 1935) is a retired professional American football player who played running back for four seasons for the Pittsburgh Steelers.

References

1935 births
Living people
American football running backs
Pittsburgh Steelers players
West Virginia Mountaineers football players
Players of American football from Pennsylvania